Sir Richard Hoghton, 1st Baronet (28 September 1570 – 1630) was a politician who sat in the House of Commons between 1601 and 1611.

He was born the eldest son of Thomas Hoghton of Hoghton Tower, Lancashire by Anne, the daughter of Henry Keighley of Keighley, Yorkshire. Thomas was killed in family feud in 1589.

He was appointed High Sheriff of Lancashire for 1599 and was knighted in January 1600. In 1601 he was elected Member of Parliament (MP) for Lancashire and was re-elected MP for Lancashire in 1604.

Houghton was one of the first ten baronets created, on 22 May 1611.

Sir Richard was a suspected Crypto-Catholic.

Hoghton died in 1630. He had married firstly Catherine, the daughter of Sir Gilbert Gerard with whom he had five sons and eight daughters, and secondly Jane, the daughter of Thomas Spencer of Rufford and widow of Robert Hesketh, with whom he had two more sons. The baronetcy was inherited by his eldest son Gilbert.

References

1570 births
1630 deaths
Baronets in the Baronetage of England
17th-century Presbyterians
English Presbyterians
16th-century English people
Members of the Parliament of England (pre-1707) for Lancashire
High Sheriffs of Lancashire
English MPs 1601
English MPs 1604–1611
People from Hoghton